Shasta is a former settlement in Alexander County, Illinois, United States. Shasta was located along the Mississippi River northwest of Tankville.

References

Geography of Alexander County, Illinois
Ghost towns in Illinois